Bruno Corazzari (born 30 December 1940) is an Italian film, television and stage actor.

Life and career 
Born in Castellarano, Reggio Emilia, Corazzari started his career in the second half of the sixties, playing minor roles in a number of Spaghetti Western films, usually being cast as a bad gunslinger and a member of the villain's band. In a few years he played roles of greater weight in other genres, namely giallo, poliziotteschi and adventure films. He was also active in art films, working with Marco Bellocchio, Franco Brocani and Maurizio Ponzi, among others. Since the late 1970s Corazzari focused his activities on television, appearing on numerous TV-movies and series, sometimes in main roles.

Selected filmography

 Death Rides a Horse (1967) - Walcott's Bartender
 Halleluja for Django (1967)
 The Belle Starr Story (1968) - Pinkerton Man
 A Long Ride from Hell (1968) - Shorty
 Per 100.000 dollari ti ammazzo (1968) - Gary
 Days of Fire (1968) - Affatato
 Ace High (1968) - Scaife
 The Great Silence (1968) - Charlie (uncredited)
 Once Upon a Time in the West (1968) - 3rd Member of Cheyenne's Gang (uncredited)
 Battle of the Commandos (1969) - Pvt. Frank Madigan
 Fortunata y Jacinta (1969) - Maximiliano Rubín
 La diligencia de los condenados (1970) - Anthony Stevens
 Roy Colt and Winchester Jack (1970) - Reverend's lead henchman
 Adiós, Sabata (1970) - Hertz
 A Man Called Sledge (1970) - Bice
 Necropolis (1970) - Frankenstein's monster
 Cloud of Dust... Cry of Death... Sartana Is Coming (1970) - Sam Puttnam
 The Strange Vice of Mrs. Wardh (1971) - Killer
 Terrible Day of the Big Gundown (1971) - Rod Fargas
 Drummer of Vengeance (1971) - Bill
 La primera entrega (1971)
 Seven Blood-Stained Orchids (1972) - Barrett
 The Master Touch (1972) - Eric
 The Sicilian Connection (1972) - Larry
 High Crime (1973) - Scavino's Assassin
 Milano trema: la polizia vuole giustizia (1973) - Hood
 Anna: the Pleasure, the Torment (1973) - Albino
 Ingrid sulla strada (1974) - The painter
 Last Days of Mussolini (1974) - Lt. Fritz Birzer
 La muerte llama a las 10 (1974) - JOHN Kirk Lawford
 Puzzle (1974) - George
 E cominciò il viaggio nella vertigine (1974) - Secundo ufficiale nel treno
 The Suspect (1975) - Tommaso Lenzini
 Giubbe rosse (1975) - Logan
 Four of the Apocalypse (1975) - Lemmy
 Quanto è bello lu murire acciso (1975) - 'Ntoni
 La Orca (1976) - Paolo
 Live Like a Cop, Die Like a Man (1976) - Morandi
 The Cynic, the Rat and the Fist (1977) - Ettore
 I Am Afraid (1977) - La Rosa
 Sette note in nero (1977) - Canevari
 The Black Cat (1981) - Ferguson
 Dove volano i corvi d'argento (1982)
 Hanna K. (1983) - Court president
 Thunder Warrior (1983) - Frank
 Il tenente dei carabinieri (1986) - Lorenzini
 La vita di scorta (1986) - Alfio
 The Moro Affair (1986) - Secretary of the DC
 Black Tunnel (1986) - Huppert
 Un tassinaro a New York (1987)
 The Green Inferno (1988) - Child Smuggler
 Un uomo di razza (1989) - Sandro
 The Sleazy Uncle (1989) - Il medico
 Mal d'Africa (1990) - Mike
 L'avvoltoio può attendere (1991) - Gary
 Count Max (1991) - George
 Mutande pazze (1992) - TV Director
 Body Puzzle (1992) - Prof. Brusco
 Ricky & Barabba (1992) - Sandro Bonetti
 Nel continente nero (1993) - Armando Feletti
 Fade out (Dissolvenza al nero) (1994)
 Marching in Darkness (1996) - The Colonel
 The Prince of Homburg (1997) - Kottwitz
 Ogni volta che te ne vai (2004) - Galvan

References

External links 

1940 births
People from the Province of Reggio Emilia
Italian male stage actors
Italian male film actors
Italian male television actors
Living people
Male Spaghetti Western actors